Plasmodium uzungwiense is a parasite of the genius Plasmodium subgenus Lacertamoeba. 

Like all Plasmodium species P. uzungwiense has both vertebrate and insect hosts. The vertebrate hosts for this parasite are reptiles.

Description 

The parasite was first described by Telford in 1988.

Geographical occurrence 

This species was described in Tanzania.

Clinical features and host pathology 

The only known hosts are chameleons (Chamaeleo species)

References 

uzungwiense